This is the list of characters in the anime series Stratos 4.

Main characters

Shimoji airbase
 
 
 A candidate pilot. The 16-year-old main protagonist. Despite coming from an elite class pilot family, Mikaze initially had no interest in becoming a pilot and was an underachiever and a slacker. However, she learns later the importance of piloting.

 
 
 A candidate pilot and also the daughter of a photographer. Studious and ambitious, Shizuha is the yes-woman of the group. Like Mikaze, she is also 16 years old.
 
 
 Voiced by: Shiho Kikuchi (Mie Sonozaki in Stratos 4 Advance Kanketsuhen) (Japanese), Elisa Fiorillo (English)
 A candidate pilot and also the daughter of a politician. Ayamo is fiery and hot-headed and eager to become a Comet Blaster and is fed up with Mikaze's laziness. She is 17 years old making her the oldest.

 
 
 A candidate pilot. Karin is a quiet girl who seems to be distracted from reality and likes to text-message her cell phone. She is afraid of cats in general and is 15 years old making her the youngest.

 
 
 The sub-commander and instructor. She is in her mid-twenties.

 
 
 An official pilot and instructor. He is in his mid-twenties.

 
 
 Chief mechanic. He is married to Miharu, but has been separated from her for various years when the series starts. He is 36 years old.

 
 
 He is the commander of the Shimoji base, he is of British nationality and is 63 years old.

Secondary characters

Shimoji airbase
 
 
 An official pilot and instructor. He is in his mid-twenties.

 
 
 A candidate pilot. He is 17 years old.

 
 
 A candidate pilot. He is 16 years old.

 
 
 Air traffic controller

Kouchin Restaurant
 
 
 Elderly Kouchin restaurant chef, and former expert pilot (as revealed in later episodes).

 
 
 Kouchin restaurant waitress. She is 22 years old.

 
 
 An old female cat of 18 years old.

Orbital Station #7
 
 
 Commander of Orbital Station #7. She is 28 years old.

 
 
 Member of Comet Blasters

 
 
 Member of Comet Blasters

 
 
 Member of Comet Blasters

 
 
 Member of Comet Blasters

Stratos 4: Advance

External links
 

Stratos 4